Club Handbol Canyamelar is a Spanish women's handball club from Valencia in División de Honor.

The club was created in June 2013 after the disappearance of the CE Handbol Marítim due to the great debts that it had.

Season to season

References

External links

Spanish handball clubs
Sport in Valencia
Handball clubs established in 2013
Sports teams in the Valencian Community